Leo "Kid" Roy (1904 – 4 October 1955 (aged 51)) born in Lowell, Massachusetts, United States was an American/Canadian professional feather/lightweight boxer of the 1920s and 1930s who won the Canadian featherweight title, Canadian lightweight title, and British Empire featherweight title. 

Lightweight.

Roy was managed by Raoul Godbout.

References

External links

Image - Leo Roy

1904 births
1955 deaths

Canadian male boxers
Date of birth missing
Featherweight boxers
Lightweight boxers
Boxers from Massachusetts
Sportspeople from Lowell, Massachusetts
Place of death missing
American male boxers